Yves Beneyton (born 3 August 1946) is a French actor.

Filmography

External links 
 

French male film actors
French male television actors
French male stage actors
French male voice actors
1946 births
Living people